Heili Grossmann (born 23 November 1984 in Tartu) is a retired Estonian curler from Tallinn, Estonia.

Career
Grossmann competed in her first international event at the 2017 European Curling Championships where she served as alternate for the Marie Turmann rink. There, the team won the bronze medal in the B Division. Grossmann joined the Turmann team the following season as their second. Team Turmann had won the 2018 Estonian Women's Curling Championship, qualifying the team to represent Estonia at the 2018 European Curling Championships At the 2018 Euros, the team finished second in the B Division, losing in the final to Norway's Kristin Skaslien. This qualified Estonia for the 2019 World Qualification Event for a chance to make it to the 2019 World Women's Curling Championship. Grossmann did not compete at the qualification event, as she was replaced by Triin Madisson. In 2019, the team won their first World Curling Tour event at the Tallinn Ladies International Challenger. A few weeks later, the team once again represented Estonia at the 2019 European Curling Championships where they got to compete in the A Division. They finished with a 2–7 record, which qualified them once again for the 2020 World Qualification Event. There, they just missed the playoffs with a 4–3 record. The team won two more national championships in 2020 and 2021.

Due the COVID-19 pandemic, the field at the 2021 World Women's Curling Championship was expanded to fourteen teams, after the 2020 World Women's Curling Championship was cancelled. The 2021 event was originally planned to be hosted by Switzerland, giving that nation an automatic entry. This gave Europe an extra qualification spot for the 2021 Worlds, which was based on the results of the 2019 European Championship, the last Euros held before the pandemic. As they had finished eighth, this qualified Estonia and the Turmann rink for the 2021 Worlds, the first time Estonia would play at the World Championships. At the World Championships, the team finished in last with a 1–12 record. Their lone win came against Germany.

Personal life
Grossmann is employed as a solution manager for digital e-recruiting. She is married and has two children.

Teams

References

External links

Living people
1984 births
Estonian female curlers
Estonian curling champions
Sportspeople from Tartu
Sportspeople from Tallinn